Scout Tufankjian is an Armenian-American photojournalist and author based in Brooklyn, New York. She is well known for her photos of American President Barack Obama during his campaign leading up to his presidency. She is also known for her photojournalism work on the Armenian diaspora.

Early life and education 
She was born in Boston, Massachusetts to an Armenian-American father, Allan, a lawyer, and an Irish-American mother, Betty. She grew up in the south shore towns of Whitman and Scituate, both in Massachusetts.  As a child she was separated from the Armenian community in Massachusetts. Her knowledge of the her Armenian heritage came from reading magazines and newspapers that she found at her grandparents home.  She started shooting in Northern Ireland at age 18.

She attended and earned a B.A. in Political Science and Government from Yale University in 2000.

Languages : English, Arabic

Career 
From 2006 to 2008 she covered Senator Barack Obama's campaign for President of the United States, and was the only independent journalist to follow him from the run up to his announcing his candidacy through his victory on election night. Tufankjian took more than 12,000 photographs throughout the campaign. She released a book featuring a selection of the photographs titled Yes We Can: Barack Obama's History-Making Presidential Campaign in December 2008, which sold out its initial 55,000 copy run a month before it was released.

In 2010 she went to cover the Haiti Earthquake and its aftermath.

From 2011 to 2012 Tufankjian went to Egypt to photograph The Egyptian Revolution.  From this time she has Photos categorized as The Egyptian Revaluation, The Detainees, Along the Barricades, Endgame, The Egyptian Elections and Egypt's Salafi Community.

In August 2012, Tufankjian took a photo of Michelle Obama and President Barack Obama hugging each other. The photo was taken in Dubuque, IA in Aug15th.  Instead of focusing on the Obamas as political figures, Tufankjian focused on them as a couple. The Obama campaign staff sent this picture out on the official Obama Facebook and Twitter accounts the night of the election, 6 Nov. 2012. This picture became the most liked photo on Facebook and most retweeted tweet in history.

In 2015 Tufankjian published in commemoration of the Centennial of the Armenian genocide, There is only the Earth: Images for Armenian Diaspora. Tufankjian took 6 years and traveled to 5 different continents gathering stories and photos of the Arminian people who were killed and displaces from their homes by the Ottoman government  between 1915 and 1923. Tufankjian traveled to Ethiopia, Syria, Turkey, Lebanon, Argentina, France, United States, Hing Kong, and Canada in search of Arminian communities, photographing Armenian lives around the world.

Works
Images from the Middle East (2006)
Yes We Can: Barack Obama's History-Making Presidential Campaign (2008)
Haiti 2010 The Haitian Earthquake, A Tale of Two Camps 
Egypt 2011-2012: A Year of Revaluation 
 There Is Only the Earth: Images from the Armenian Diaspora Project, Melcher Media, 2015. A photojournalist's study of the Armenian diaspora on its 100th anniversary
Commissioned work: The HALO Trust: 100 Women in Demining (2017)
Ongoing Projects Karabakh: 2002-2020

Personal life 
In 2010, Scout Tufankjian married Nate Schenkkan who is also a Yale and Columbia graduate and former journalist.

References

Further reading 
 Gonzalez, David, "Following the Global Armenian Diaspora", The New York Times, 24 April 2014

External links
 Scout Tufankjian's website
 An interview at buzzflash.com
 "Armenian roots and traveling with Obama – interview with photojournalist Scout Tufankjian", news.am, 19 November 2012

Living people
American photojournalists
American people of Armenian descent
Year of birth missing (living people)
American women photographers
Women photojournalists